Baldwin Hamey the Elder, M.D., LRCP, also Baudouin Hamey (1568–1640) was a Flemish physician who settled in London.

Life
Hamey was born at Bruges, and studied at the University of Leyden, where he graduated M.D. in 1592. He was nominated by Johannes Heurnius for a post under Feodor II of Russia, who had asked the Rector of Leiden for a physician. He held the position from 1594 to 1597, when he resigned. Mark Ridley was another physician in Moscow at the same time: it is thought they both made the mistake of coming without ensuring a legal right to leave.

In 1598 Hamey returned to Holland, and in the same year settled in London. There he had a marginal and unlicensed practice, largely among immigrants, for a dozen years. He was admitted a licentiate of the College of Physicians on 12 January 1610. He then practised with success till his death, of a pestilential fever, 10 November 1640. He was buried on the north side of the church of All Hallows Barking, and his three children erected a monument in the church to his memory. He left money to the College of Physicians.

Hamey was a member of the Dutch Reformed humanist circle around the London church of Simon Ruytinck. He associated in it with Jacob Cool (Ortelianus) and Raphael Thorius. As a physician he was a conservative Galenist. A laudatory biography was written by Richard Palmer.

Family
Hamey in 1598 married Sara Oeils, in Amsterdam. His niece, Mary Oeils, married George Johnson MP. His eldest son, Baldwin Hamey the younger also became a physician. His second son was a merchant in London, and his daughter married a Mr. Palmer.

Notes

Attribution

1568 births
1640 deaths
Spanish Netherlands emigrants to England
Physicians from Bruges
Flemish physicians